This article will display the squads for the 2005 African Youth Championship. Only players born on or after 1 January 1985 were eligible to play.

















External links 
 2005 African Youth Championship Squads

Africa U-20 Cup of Nations squads